The 1980 Five Nations Championship was the 51st Five Nations Championship series of the annual rugby union competition contested by the national teams of , , , , and . Including the previous incarnations as the Home Nations and Five Nations, this was the 86th series of the northern hemisphere rugby union championship. The tournament began on 19 January and concluded on 15 March.

 were the champions, winning the championship outright for the first time since 1963; they had also shared in the quintuple tie in 1973. It was England's 18th championship, excluding ten titles shared with other teams. In winning all four matches they won the Grand Slam for the eighth time, equalling the record held by Wales. It was England's first Grand Slam since 1957 and only their second since 1928. England's victories over Ireland, Wales and Scotland also gave them the Triple Crown for the first time since 1960 and the fifteenth time overall. Wales' close one point loss to England at Twickenham in a highly volatile match that took place during the 1980 British Steel strike, and Wales' later one-sided loss to Ireland at Lansdowne Road on the final weekend, signalled the end of Wales' glory days from the 1970s.

Participants
The teams involved were:

Table

Squads

Results

External links

The official RBS Six Nations Site

Six Nations Championship seasons
Five Nations
Five Nations
Five Nations
Five Nations
Five Nations
Five Nations
 
Five Nations
Five Nations
Five Nations